Salmelainen is a Finnish surname.

Geographical distribution
As of 2014, 94.5% of all known bearers of the surname Salmelainen were residents of Finland (frequency 1:24,760), 2.1% of Sweden (1:1,969,352) and 2.1% of Australia (1:4,754,775).

In Finland, the frequency of the surname was higher than national average (1:24,760) in the following regions:
 1. North Karelia (1:5,086)
 2. Southern Savonia (1:15,895)
 3. Central Finland (1:16,737)
 4. Uusimaa (1:17,584)
 5. Kymenlaakso (1:18,989)
 6. Tavastia Proper (1:23,877)

People
Tony Salmelainen, Finnish ice-hockey player
Tommi Salmelainen, Finnish ice-hockey player

References

Finnish-language surnames
Surnames of Finnish origin